The fanfin skate (Pseudoraja fischeri) is a species of skate in the family Arhynchobatidae. It is the only species in the monotypic genus Pseudoraja. This pelagic skate occurs in the Atlantic Ocean from Florida and through the Gulf of Mexico to Honduras.

References 

Rajiformes
Fish described in 1954
Taxa named by Henry Bryant Bigelow
Taxa named by William Charles Schroeder